Kulturkirken Jakob (in English St. James Church of Culture) is a church in Oslo, Norway, designed by architect Georg Andreas Bull and built in 1880. The original name of the Church was St James's Church or Jakobs kirke.

The church is named after the Apostle James (the Great), in Norwegian language: Apostelen Jakob.

The altarpiece of the building year by Eilif Peterssen and shows the adoring shepherds.
In the porch hangs a relief of the Archangel Michael.

Church of Culture 

The church, with 600 seats, served as the parish church of Jakob parish until 1985, when it was closed by the  due to building restoration.  The church was reopened in February 2000 as a church of culture, directed by Kirkelig Kulturverksted for long term rental of the Church of Norway (Kirkelig Fellesråd) in Oslo.

The church is one of the few pure churches of culture, with performances of theater, dance and other cultural expressions. The basement has showrooms for exhibitions.

References

External links 
 Homepage in Norwegian

Churches in Oslo
Churches completed in 1880
1880 establishments in Norway
19th-century Church of Norway church buildings